Sombrero is a 1953 American musical romance film directed by Norman Foster and starring Ricardo Montalbán, Pier Angeli, Vittorio Gassman and Cyd Charisse.

Plot 
Three couples involved in budding romances are caught in the middle of a feud between two Mexican villages.

Cast

Production 
The film was based on the 1945 book Mexican Village by Josefina Niggli. It was a collection of 11 short stories set in the north Mexican town of Hidalgo. The New York Times called it "remarkable...one of the finest books about Mexico."

In June 1951, MGM announced they had bought the screen rights as a "possible vehicle for Ricardo Montalbán" and assigned Jack Cummings to produce. In July, Norman Foster was signed to direct and co-write the script with Niggli; the cast was Montalbán, Cyd Charisse and Fernando Lamas, plus one American – Joseph Cotten, Wendell Corey and John Hodiak were the favorites for this. (Both Cummins and Foster had made movies in Mexico.) Eventually the role of an American character was removed. Niggli and Foster collaborated on the script over six months.

In April 1952, Cornel Wilde was being sought for a lead role. By this stage the title of the film had changed from Mexican Village to Sombrero. Vittorio Gassman, Pier Angeli and Ava Gardner joined the cast; it was Gassman's second American film after The Glass Wall. Gardner dropped out in late April and was put on suspension by MGM (lifted when she agreed to make Mogambo).

Then Lamas refused to make the film because it meant going on location in Mexico; MGM suspended him until he agreed to star in The Girl Who Had Everything. By May, Yvonne de Carlo, Nina Foch and Kurt Kaznar joined the cast. Rick Jason joined the cast (presumably replacing Lamas), making his film debut. Dore Schary said he expected Gassmann and Jason to become big stars.

Filming started June 1952. The movie was shot on location in Mexico City, Cuernavaca, Tetecala and Tepoztln, Mexico.

De Carlo did all her scenes with Gassman. "We got along wonderfully," she said. "He's a wonderful actor."

Reception

Box office 
According to MGM records, the film earned $1,071,000 in the U.S. and Canada, and $1,389,000 in other markets, resulting in a profit of $592,000.

Proposed follow-up movie 
In September 1952, before the film was released, MGM announced Foster would write a follow-up movie based on three or four other stories in the collection Mexican Village that were not used in Sombrero, but no film was made.

References

External links 

1953 films
Metro-Goldwyn-Mayer films
Films set in Mexico
1950s romantic musical films
American romantic musical films
Films directed by Norman Foster
Cockfighting in film
1950s English-language films
1950s American films